Mark Matkevich is an American art gallerist and actor best known for appearing as Drue Valentine in 17 episodes of the television program Dawson's Creek. He also appeared in the film Sweet Home Alabama, where he played Patrick Dempsey's friend.  Matkevich also had recurring roles on Ed and Joan of Arcadia. He played Dan, a medical student, in the episode "Haunted" of Tru Calling and had a guest star role in Season 5 of NCIS.  He appeared in the Showtime show Dexter. He also was a guest star on Drake & Josh in the episode "Guitar," where he plays rock guitarist Devin Malone for whom Drake substitutes in a concert after Josh accidentally injures Devin's hand.

In 2011, Matkevich started Axiom Contemporary, an art gallery in Santa Monica, California.  Axiom specializes in pop, abstract, neo-street, and contemporary art works from international artists in all mediums. Axiom has attended and shown at art fairs in New York, San Francisco, Miami, Hong Kong, Los Angeles and Aspen.

Matkevich graduated from Cardinal O'Hara High School in Springfield, Pennsylvania and attended Temple University in Philadelphia.

Filmography

References

External links

Living people
Male actors from Philadelphia
Temple University alumni
1978 births